Barry Barringer (1888–1938) was an American screenwriter. He also directed three films during the silent era He generally worked for low-budget Poverty Row companies.

Filmography

 One Glorious Day (1922)
 Vengeance of the Deep (1923)
 Heads Up (1925)
 Smilin' at Trouble (1925)
 Frenzied Flames (1926)
 The Warning Signal (1926)
 Fire and Steel (1927)
 Hazardous Valley (1927)
 Duty's Reward (1927)
 Roaring Fires (1927)
 Riding to Fame (1927)
 Code of the Air (1928)
 Bye, Bye, Buddy (1929)
 Convicted (1931)
 Graft (1931)
 The Lightning Flyer (1931)
 The Face on the Barroom Floor (1932)
 Murder at Dawn (1932)
 Dynamite Denny (1932)
 The Death Kiss (1932)
 The Midnight Patrol (1932)
 Daring Daughters (1933)
 The Dude Ranger (1934)
 The Return of Chandu (1934)
 The Way of the West (1934)
 What's Your Racket? (1934)
 Sixteen Fathoms Deep (1934)
 Valley of Wanted Men (1935)
 Courage of the North (1935)
 Timber Terrors (1935)
 Northern Frontier (1935)
 Men of Action (1935)
 Red Blood of Courage (1935)
 Timber War (1935)
 Federal Agent (1936)
 Song of the Trail (1936)
 Held for Ransom (1938)

References

Bibliography
 Michael R. Pitts. Poverty Row Studios, 1929–1940: An Illustrated History of 55 Independent Film Companies, with a Filmography for Each. McFarland & Company, 2005.

External links

1888 births
1938 deaths
American screenwriters
American film directors
People from Mobile, Alabama
20th-century American screenwriters